Golčaj is a small settlement south of Blagovica in the Municipality of Lukovica in the eastern part of the Upper Carniola region of Slovenia. It has no permanent residents.

Name
Golčaj was attested in written sources as Goltschach in 1437 and Gulczach in 1444.

Church

The local church is built on a hill above the settlement and is dedicated to Saint Agnes. It is the oldest church in the area and was first mentioned in documents dating to 1526. Its wooden coffered ceiling dates to 1680 and was restored in 1990. The main altar is from 1858.

References

External links 

Golčaj on Geopedia

Populated places in the Municipality of Lukovica